"Glory to His Name" (also called "Down At The Cross") is a hymn written by Elisha A. Hoffman in 1878. It is thought that  Hoffman was reading about the crucifixion of Jesus in the Bible and began to think about how God saved men from their sins by allowing Jesus to die on the cross. The poem Hoffman wrote based on these thoughts was called "Glory to His Name". John Stockton, a musician and member of Hoffman's church, set the poem to music.

Lyrics 
Down at the cross where my Savior died, Down where for cleansing from sin I cried;
There to my heart was the blood applied, Glory to His Name.

Refrain:
Glory to His name, glory to His name;
There to my heart was the blood applied, Glory to His name.

I am so wondrously saved from sin, Jesus so sweetly abides within;
There at the cross where He took me in, Glory to His name.

(Refrain)

Oh, precious fountain that saves from sin, I am so glad I have entered in;
There Jesus saves me and keeps me clean, Glory to His name. 

(Refrain)

Come to this fountain so rich and sweet, Cast your poor soul at the Savior's feet;
Plunge in today, and be made complete; Glory to His name!

(Refrain)

External links 
 https://www.youtube.com/watch?v=vQAav74_X18

References
 

American Christian hymns
1878 songs
1878 in Christianity
19th-century hymns